Whitney Lewis (born August 13, 1985) is a former American college football player. Lewis started his college career at University of Southern California in 2003, but transferred to the University of Northern Iowa after his sophomore season. Lewis graduated from St. Bonaventure High School in 2003 and played in that year's U.S. Army All-American Bowl. He was given the Glenn Davis Award for the top prep football player in Southern California.

In 2002, he was the first player in California High School football history to rush for 1,000+ yards and receive for 1,000+ in the same season.

References

External links 
 Player Bio at CSTV.com

1985 births
Living people
Players of American football from California
Sportspeople from Oxnard, California
American football wide receivers
USC Trojans football players
Northern Iowa Panthers football players
Sportspeople from Ventura County, California